The National emblem of Iran since the 1979 Iranian Revolution features four curves and a sword, surmounted by a shadda. The emblem was designed by Hamid Nadimi, and was officially approved by Ayatollah Ruhollah Khomeini on 9 May 1980.

The four curves, surmounted by the shadda, are a stylized representation of the word Allah. The five parts of the emblem also symbolize the Principles of the Religion. The shape of the emblem is chosen to resemble a tulip, in memory of the people who died for Iran: it is an ancient belief in Iran, dating back to mythology, that if a young soldier dies patriotically, a red tulip will grow on his grave. In recent years, it has been considered the symbol of martyrdom.

The logo is encoded in Unicode at code point  in the Miscellaneous Symbols range. In Unicode 1.0 this symbol was known as "SYMBOL OF IRAN". However, the current name for the character was adopted as part of Unicode's merger with ISO/IEC 10646.

Symbols used in ancient Persia

Derafsh Shahbaz

During the Achaemenid Empire, especially at the time of Cyrus the Great, the Imperial Standard was made up of a kinglike image, Square in shape, split into four equivalent triangles. Each two of these four train triangles had the same colour.
In the excavations at Persepolis, archaeologists have found a standard, depicting Shahbaz with open wings.

Derafsh Kaviani

The name Drafš-e Kāvīān means "the standard of the kay(s)" (i.e., "kings", kias, kavis ) or "of Kāva." The latter meaning is an identification with an Iranian legend in which the Derafš-e Kāvīān was the standard of a mythological Persian blacksmith-turned-hero named Kaveh (Persian: کاوه), who led a popular uprising against the foreign demon-like ruler Zahhak (Persian: ضحاک). Recalling the legend, the 10th-century epic Shahnameh recasts Zahhak as an evil and tyrannical ruler, against whom Kaveh called the people to arms, using his leather blacksmith apron as a standard, with a spear as its hoist. In the story, after the war that called for the kingship of Fereydun (Persian: فریدون) had been won, the people decorated the apron with jewels and the flag became the symbol of Iranian nationalism and resistance against foreign tyranny.
The symbol of Derafsh Kaviani is a Lotus flower, whose history goes back to the beliefs of ancient Iran from the Achaemenid period.

Faravahar

The Faravahar is one of the best-known symbols of Zoroastrianism. This religious-cultural symbol was adopted by the Pahlavi dynasty to represent the Iranian nation, and after the Iranian revolution it has remained in use in contemporary Iranian nationalism.

The winged disc has a long history in the art and culture of the ancient Near and Middle East. Historically, the symbol is influenced by the "winged sun" hieroglyph appearing on Bronze Age royal seals (Luwian SOL SUUS, symbolizing royal power in particular). In Neo-Assyrian times, a human bust is added to the disk, the "feather-robed archer" interpreted as symbolizing Ashur.
It was only during the reign of Darius I and thereafter, that the symbol was combined with a human form above the wings, perhaps representing Darius himself.

Early modern Iran

The Lion and Sun motif is one of the better known emblems of Kingdom Of Persia, and between 1576 and 1979 was an element in the flag of Iran.

The motif, which combines "ancient Iranian, Arab, Turkish, and Mongol traditions", became a popular symbol in Iran in the 12th century. The lion and sun symbol is based largely on astronomical and astrological configurations; the ancient zodiacal sign of the sun in the house of Leo, which itself is traced backed to Babylonian astrology and Near Eastern traditions.

The motif has many historical meanings. First, it was an astrological and zodiacal symbol. Under Safvis and first Qajar kings, it received a specifically Shi'ite interpretation. In Safavid era the lion and sun stood for two pillars of the society, state and religion. It became a national emblem during the Qajar era. In the 19th century, European visitors at the Qajar court attributed the lion and sun to remote antiquity and since then it got a nationalistic interpretation.

During the reign of Fat'h Ali Shah and his successors, the motif was substantially changed. These changes were on the form of the lion, the sun. A crown was also placed on the top the symbol to represent the monarchy.

Since the reign of Fat'h Ali Shah Qajar, the Islamic component of the ruler de-emphasized. This shifting affects the symbolism of the emblem. Since this time until the 1979 revolution the meaning of the symbol elements changed many times. The lion could be the metaphor for Ali, heroes of Iran who are ready to protect the country against enemies, and finally its ancient meaning as the symbol of kingship. The Sun received various meanings including the king, Jamshid, the mythical king of Iran, and motherhomeland.

The many historical meanings of the emblem have provided the rich ground for competing symbols of Iranian identity. After the Constitutional Revolution of 1906, Parliament designed a new flag and a new coat of arms.
In the 20th century, some politicians and scholars suggested that the emblem be replaced by other symbols such as the Derafsh Kaviani. However, the emblem remained the official symbol of Iran until the Iranian Revolution, when the "Lion and Sun" symbol was removed from public spaces and government organizations and replaced by the present-day Coat of arms of Iran.

Imperial State of Iran

The first version of the modern Iranian tricolour was adopted in the wake of the Iranian Constitutional Revolution of 1906. The Supplementary Fundamental Laws of 7 October 1907 described the flag as a tricolour of green, white, and red, with a lion and sun emblem in the middle. A decree dated 4 September 1910 specified the exact details of the emblem, including the shape of the lion's tail ("like an italic S") and the position and the size of the lion, the sword, and the sun.

In 1932, seven years after the foundation of the Imperial State of Iran, Reza Shah founded the Order of Pahlavi with the official emblem of the dynasty (Mount Damavand with a rising sun) in a medallion of the Order's badge and star. The coat of arms was created with Iran's national and Pahlavi's dynastical symbols: Lion and Sun, Faravahar, Zolfaghar, Simurgh and Pahlavi's arms in the center. At the top of the coat of arms was the Pahlavi crown, created for the Coronation of Reza Shah in 1926, and the collar of the Order of Pahlavi was under the shield. The lions with scimitars were the supporters. The Imperial motto "Mara dad farmud va Khod Davar Ast" ("Justice He bids me do, as He will judge me" or, alternatively, "He gave me power to command, and He is the judge"). In 1971, some details of this Imperial achievement were changed in their colours.

Azure and Or are the colours of the Imperial Family.

The Imperial Standards of Iran were the personal official flags of the Shāhanshāh, Shahbānū, and Crown Prince of Iran, adopted at the beginning of 1971. The flags of Shāhanshāh consists of a pale-blue field with the flag of Iran in the upper left corner and the Pahlavi coat of arms in the center. Emblems were also created for the Shahbānū and Crown Prince of Iran, and these are at the center of their respective flags.

The Interim Government also used the lion and sun emblem during the transitional period after the revolution, and before the current emblem was adopted.

Islamic Republic of Iran
Following the Iranian Revolution, Ayatollah Ruhollah Khomeini called for the dismantling of the lion and sun symbols during a speech on March 1, 1979. Despite the emblem's traditional Shia meanings and the lion's association with Ali, the first Imam of the Shia, the first emblem of the Islamic Republic, which consisted of several stars and fists, designed by Sadegh Tabrizi, was adopted on January 30, 1980. Finally on 9 May 1980, the current emblem was adopted.

See also

 Flag of Iran
 Lion and Sun
 Faravahar
 List of flags used by Iranian peoples
 Imperial Standards of Iran

Notes

References

Works cited
 

Iran
Iranian culture
National symbols of Iran
 
1980 establishments in Iran
Iran